Bonavista—Burin—Trinity is a federal electoral district on Newfoundland Island in Newfoundland and Labrador, Canada, that has been represented in the House of Commons of Canada since 2015.

Bonavista—Burin—Trinity was created by the 2012 federal electoral boundaries redistribution and has been legally defined in the 2013 representation order. It came into effect upon the call of the 42nd Canadian federal election, scheduled for October 2015. It was created out of parts of the electoral districts of Random—Burin—St. George's (41%), Bonavista—Gander—Grand Falls—Windsor (37%) and Avalon (22%).

Under the proposed 2022 Canadian federal electoral redistribution, this riding would be renamed Terra Nova—The Peninsulas.

Demographics
According to the 2011 National Household Survey, Bonavista—Burin—Trinity is the most Christian riding in Canada with 97% of the population claiming to have a Christian affiliation. It is also the only riding in Canada where less than 3% of the population has no religious affiliation.

According to the Canada 2021 Census

Ethnic groups: 96.8% White, 2.4% Indigenous
Languages: 99.1% English
Religions: 88.8% Christian (25.8% Anglican, 22.9% United Church, 20.3% Catholic, 11.2% Methodist, 4.1% Pentecostal), 10.8% No Religion
Median income: $31,600 (2020)
Average income: $39,840 (2020)

Geography
The riding contains the Bonavista Bay area, the Burin Peninsula and the Trinity Bay area of Newfoundland.

History
The riding of Bonavista—Burin—Trinity was created in 2013 from the electoral districts of Random—Burin—St. George's, Bonavista—Gander—Grand Falls—Windsor and Avalon.

Election results

2021 general election

2019 general election

2017 by-election

2015 general election

Student Vote Results

2019

2015

References

Newfoundland and Labrador federal electoral districts